The Los Angeles Film Critics Association Award for Best Editing is one of the annual film awards given by the Los Angeles Film Critics Association.

2010s

2020s

See also 
Academy Award for Best Film Editing

References

Los Angeles Film Critics Association Awards
Awards established in 2012
Film editing awards